The Center for Global Nonkilling (originally known as the Center for Global Nonviolence) is an international non-profit organization focused on the promotion of change toward the measurable goal of a killing-free world. The Center for Global Nonkilling is an NGO in Special Consultative Status with the United Nations Economic and Social Council and a participant organization of the World Health Organization's Violence Prevention Alliance.

History
The history of the Center for Global Nonkilling started in 1988 in Honolulu, Hawai‘i, as the "Center for Global Nonviolence Planning Project", an exploratory initiative set up at the Spark M. Matsunaga Institute for Peace and Conflict Resolution, University of Hawaiʻi, by Professor Glenn D. Paige. Its purpose was to be a creative facilitator of research, education-training, and action in the form of problem-solving leadership for nonviolent global transformation. During this phase the Center was responsible for a series of publications and events in partnership with the University of Hawaiʻi.

In 1994, the Center for Global Nonviolence was finally established as an independent nonprofit, focusing on research and networking. Notable outcomes where the publication of Nonkilling Global Political Science in 2002 and the celebration of the "First Global Nonkilling Leadership Forum" in November 2007, Co-chaired by Nobel Peace Laureate Mairead Maguire. A major outcome from the Forum was the acknowledged need and demonstrated support for establishing a successor Center for Global Nonkilling, along with an associated Global Nonkilling Leadership Academy. This would come about in 2008 with the transition from Center for Global Nonviolence to Center for Global Nonkilling.

On its official website, the Center for Global Nonkilling defines its mission as the following:

{{Cquote|Small, creative, and catalytic in partnership with individuals and institutions locally and worldwide—by combining and sharing the spirit, science, skills, arts, institutions and resources of all—the Center for Global Nonkilling can contribute to new and renewed leadership for change towards a just, killing-free world in which everyone has the right not to be killed and the responsibility not to kill others. The means to achieve this mission include:Discovering and encouraging global nonkilling human capabilities
Introducing nonkilling knowledge in global education and policy
Applying nonkilling knowledge in global problem-solving
Developing and assisting nonkilling global leadership
Assisting institutions/centers for global nonkilling
Measuring, monitoring, and disseminating the impact of nonkilling global efforts.}}

Organization
The Center is governed by a chairperson, currently Anoop Swarup, together with a governing council. Its everyday business, such as meetings and publications, is executed by a Director, currently Joám Evans Pim. The Center has three UN Representatives: Christophe Barbey (Geneva), Winnie Wang (New York), and Elina Viitasaari (Gender Focal Point). The Center also has special advisers and honorary sponsors, including Máiread Corrigan Maguire, Óscar Arias, Juan Esteban Aristizábal Vásquez, A. T. Ariyaratne, Federico Mayor Zaragoza, Neelakanta Radhakrishnan, and Bernard Lafayette Jr. The Center also maintains a number of research committees.

Activities
The Center engages in four main activities, namely publications and media, including publication of working papers, articles, and books; monitoring and advocacy, mainly at the United Nations; education and training programs, with its own sets of learning materials at school and university level; and research programs, via its research committees, colloquia, and seminars.

See also
Glenn D. Paige
NonkillingNonkilling Global Political Science''
World peace

References

External links

School of Nonkilling Studies at Wikiversity
Charter for a World without Violence

1988 establishments in Hawaii
Anti–nuclear weapons movement
Peace organizations based in the United States
International organizations based in the United States
Organizations based in Honolulu
Non-profit organizations based in Hawaii
501(c)(3) organizations
Organizations established in 1988
Nonviolence organizations